Rosa Winifred Nicholson (née Roberts; 21 December 1893 – 5 March 1981) was a British painter. She was married to the painter Ben Nicholson, and was thus the daughter-in-law of the painter William Nicholson and his wife, the painter Mabel Pryde. She was the mother of the painter Kate Nicholson.

Winifred Nicholson was a colourist who developed a personal impressionistic style, concentrating on domestic still life objects and landscapes. She often combined the two subjects as seen in her painting From Bedroom Window, Bankshead showing a landscape viewed through a window, with flowers in a vase in the foreground.

Life 

Nicholson was born Rosa Winifred Roberts in Oxford on 21 December 1893. She was the eldest of the three children of the Liberal Party politician Charles Henry Roberts and Lady Cecilia Maude Howard, daughter of the politician George Howard, 9th Earl of Carlisle, and of the activist Rosalind Howard. Nicholson started painting as a teenager with her grandfather George Howard, who was a capable amateur painter and a friend of the Pre-Raphaelites William Morris and Edward Burne-Jones, and of the Italian landscape painter Nino Costa, founder of the Etruscan School. Nicholson attended the Byam Shaw School of Art in London from about 1910 or 1912 until the outbreak of the First World War in 1914, and again from 1918 to 1919.

In 1919, Nicholson travelled with her father, who had been Under-Secretary of State for India, to Burma (now Myanmar), Ceylon (now Sri Lanka) and India.

On 4 November 1920, she married the artist Ben Nicholson, the son of the painter Sir William Newzam Prior Nicholson and his wife, the painter Mabel Pryde. The couple bought a villa in Switzerland, the Villa Capriccio near the village of Castagnola on the north shore of Lake Lugano in Ticino. They spent the winters in Switzerland and the summers in Britain, painting still-lifes and landscapes. In 1924, Winifred bought Bankshead, a farmhouse built on an ancient Roman castle forming part of Hadrian's Wall, not far from the town of Brampton in Cumbria, and close to the family seat, Naworth Castle.

In 1924, Nicholson, who believed that she was unable to conceive, joined the Christian Science movement, which was in vogue in Britain at that time. She and Ben eventually had three children: Jake was born in 1927, Kate in July 1929, and Andrew in 1931. By the time of Kate's birth, there were tensions in the marriage, and these were exacerbated by the suicide of their close friend, the painter Kit Wood, in August 1930. In 1931, Ben met Barbara Hepworth – whom he later married – and he and Winifred separated. In 1932, Winifred moved with her three children to Paris, and from then until 1936 Ben often visited them there, sometimes with Hepworth. The marriage ended in divorce in 1938, and Ben married Hepworth in November of the same year.

Although it is sometimes said incorrectly that with Ben, Winifred formed part of the artist colony at St Ives, Cornwall, she was never permanently living there. Although she painted less in the abstract style than in the representational, she did experiment with her own form of abstraction in the 1930s. Influences between her and Ben were mutual, Ben often admitting he learnt much about colour from his first wife. After they separated, she lived half of each year during the 1930s in Paris. After her divorce from Ben Nicholson in 1938, she spent most of the rest of her long life in Cumberland, at Boothby where her father lived, and at Bankshead, both near Lanercost.

She died in Cumbria on 5 March 1981.

Work
She painted prolifically throughout her life, largely at home but also on trips to Italy, Greece and Scotland, among other places. Many of her works are still in private collections, but a number are in the Kettle's Yard art gallery, Cambridge, and several key works belong to Tate. One painting is believed to have hung at 10 Downing Street. She had a lifelong fascination for rainbow and spectrum colours and in the 1970s she made particularly strong, innovative use of such colours in many of her paintings. She left some written accounts of her thoughts on colour.

Nicholson supported the Taiwanese artist Li Yuan-chia, who had previously worked in Milan and London. He ran the "LYC Museum", close to Bankshead. Significant exhibitions of her works have taken place at the Tate Gallery (1987), at the Tullie House Museum and Art Gallery in Carlisle, Cumbria, at Kettle's Yard in Cambridge and at the Dean Gallery in Edinburgh. Her auction record of £200,000 was set at Sotheby's auction house in London in November 2016 for her 1928 oil and coloured pencil on panel St Ives' Harbour, from David Bowie's collection – the pop star had bought the work at Christie's in 1994.

Notes

References

Further reading
 Judith Collins (1987). Winifred Nicholson – Tate Retrospective Catalogue. The Tate Gallery, London.
 Andrew Nicholson (ed.) (1987). Unknown Colour: Painting, Letters, Writings by Winifred Nicholson. London: Faber. 
 Alice Strang (1999). Winifred Nicholson in Scotland (exhibition catalogue). Edinburgh: National Galleries of Scotland, .
 Jon Blackwood (2001). Winifred Nicholson (exhibition catalogue). Cambridge: Kettle's Yard. .
 [s.n.] (2005) Winifred Nicholson 1893–1981: A Cumbrian Perspective (exhibition catalogue). Cockermouth: Castlegate House Gallery.
 Christopher Andreae (2009). Winifred Nicholson. Farnham: Lund Humphries. .
 [s.n.] (2012). Winifred Nicholson, Music of Colour (exhibition catalogue).  Cambridge: Kettle's Yard. .
 Jovan Nicholson (2013). Ben Nicholson, Winifred Nicholson, Christopher Wood, Alfred Wallis, William Staite Murray – Art and Life 1920 – 1931. London: Philip Wilson Publishers. 
 Christopher Wood, Anne L. Goodchild (2013). Dear Winifred: Christopher Wood, letters to Winifred and Ben Nicholson, 1926–1930. Bristol: Sansom & Company. .
 Jovan Nicholson (2016). Winifred Nicholson in Cumberland. Kendal: Abbot Hall Art Gallery. 
 Jovan Nicholson (2016). Winifred Nicholson: Liberation of Colour. London: Philip Wilson Publishers.

External links

Winifred Nicholson site
Winifred Nicholson at artcyclopedia.com
Page at Kettle's Yard, with images
Winifred Nicholson paintings in Tate collection
Winifred Nicholson paintings in Kettle's Yard collection
Winifred Nicholson paintings in UK Government Art Collection
Winifred Nicholson page at National Portrait Gallery

1893 births
1981 deaths
20th-century English painters
20th-century English women artists
Alumni of the Byam Shaw School of Art
Artists from Oxford
English women painters
English Christian Scientists
Winifred
St Ives artists